Making the Road is the third album by the Japanese punk rock band Hi-Standard. Recorded in their native country, it was released on American label Fat Wreck Chords in November 1999. The album has sold more than 650,000 copies.

The cover art is a screenshot from the finale of Akira Kurosawa's Yojimbo.

Critical reception
The Spokesman-Review wrote that the album "delivers fast, gritty punk while, at the same time, incorporating violins, violas and cellos."

Track listing
All songs written by Hi-Standard.
"Turning Back" – 0:33
"Standing Still" – 2:12
"Teenagers are All Assholes" – 2:00
"Just Rock" – 1:04
"Dear My Friends" – 3:12
"Stay Gold" – 2:00
"No Heroes" – 2:10
"Glory" – 1:50
"Please, Please, Please" – 2:30
"Green Acres" – 0:54 (1960s TV Theme)
"Changes" – 2:43 (Black Sabbath cover)
"Making the Road Blues" – 1:15
"Crows" – 1:52
"Tinkerbell Hates Goatees" – 1:26
"Pentax" – 0:34
"Nothing" – 2:51
"Starry Night" – 2:12
"Brand New Sunset" – 3:24
"Sexy Girlfriend" (hidden track) – 2:57

Personnel
 Akihiro Nanba – vocals, bass
 Ken Yokoyama – guitar, vocals
 Akira Tsuneoka – drums
 Recorded at Echo House Studio, Tokyo, Japan
 Produced by Hi-Standard
 Engineered by Osamu Seino

References

1999 albums
Hi-Standard albums
Fat Wreck Chords albums